James Cade is a Canadian actor. He is best known for playing Harmon Tedesco in the 2010 SpikeTV sitcom Blue Mountain State. He graduated from the National Theatre School of Canada and has since then performed in several theatre productions in Toronto, including Single Threat's Dora Award winning production of "A Quiet Place." Other theatre companies James has worked with include Unspun Theatre, Crate Productions, Convergence Theatre and Native Earth Performing Arts.

Cade has also been a guest combat instructor and acting coach at both Lakefield College School and Rosedale Heights School of the Arts.

Filmography

Film

Television

External links
 
 

Living people
Canadian male film actors
Canadian male television actors
Male actors from Toronto
National Theatre School of Canada alumni
21st-century Canadian male actors
Year of birth missing (living people)